Yuko Arai (born 20 September 1973) is a Japanese fencer. She competed in the women's individual and team épée events at the 1996 Summer Olympics and the individual foil event at the 2000 Summer Olympics.

References

External links
 

1973 births
Living people
Japanese female épée fencers
Olympic fencers of Japan
Fencers at the 1996 Summer Olympics
Fencers at the 2000 Summer Olympics
People from Gifu
Asian Games medalists in fencing
Fencers at the 1998 Asian Games
Fencers at the 2002 Asian Games
Asian Games bronze medalists for Japan
Medalists at the 1998 Asian Games
Medalists at the 2002 Asian Games
21st-century Japanese women
20th-century Japanese women